The 1950 Ottawa Rough Riders finished in 4th place in the Interprovincial Rugby Football Union with a 4–7–1 record and failed to qualify for the playoffs.

Preseason

Regular season

Standings

Schedule

References

Ottawa Rough Riders seasons
1950 Canadian football season by team